Gozileh (also Romanized as Gozīleh; also known as Govīzīleh) is a village in Gavork-e Nalin Rural District, Vazineh District, Sardasht County, West Azerbaijan Province, Iran. At the 2006 census, its population was 356, in 59 families.

References 

Populated places in Sardasht County